Chester Craig Hosmer (May 6, 1915 – October 11, 1982) was an American lawyer and politician who served as a United States representative from California from 1953 to 1974.

Early life and career
Hosmer was born in Brea, California, in Orange County. He attended the public schools, graduated from Long Beach Polytechnic High School. Hosmer graduated from the University of California, Berkeley in 1937.

Hosmer attended the University of Michigan Law School in 1938 and graduated from the University of Southern California Law School in 1940. He was admitted to the bar in 1940 and began practice in Long Beach, California.

Military career
He enlisted in the United States Navy in July 1940 and advanced to the rank of commander; rear admiral, Naval Reserve.

Legal career
He was an attorney with the U.S. Atomic Energy Commission at Los Alamos, New Mexico and special assistant United States District Attorney for New Mexico in 1948. He then returned to Long Beach, California to private practice.

Congress
Hosmer was an unsuccessful Republican candidate for election in 1950 to the Eighty-second Congress. He was elected as a Republican to the Eighty-third and to the ten succeeding Congresses and served from January 3, 1953, until his resignation December 31, 1974. Hosmer voted in favor of the Civil Rights Acts of 1957, 1960, 1964, and 1968, as well as the 24th Amendment to the U.S. Constitution, but did not vote on the Voting Rights Act of 1965. He was not a candidate for reelection in 1974 to the Ninety-fourth Congress.

Later career and death
He was president of the American Nuclear Energy Council from 1975-1979. He was a resident of Washington, D.C. until his death on October 11, 1982, aboard a cruise ship bound for Mexico.

He was buried at Arlington National Cemetery, Arlington, Virginia.

References

External links

 Chester Craig Hosmer at ArlingtonCemetery.net, an unofficial website 

1915 births
1982 deaths
People from Brea, California
United States Navy officers
Burials at Arlington National Cemetery
University of California, Berkeley alumni
University of Michigan Law School alumni
USC Gould School of Law alumni
Republican Party members of the United States House of Representatives from California
People who died at sea
20th-century American politicians
Military personnel from California